The College of Guadalupe de Zacatecas was a Roman Catholic Franciscan missionary college, or seminary (Colegio Apostolico), founded in Guadalupe, Zacatecas (Mexico) by the Order of Friars Minor between 1703 and 1707. The institution was established to provide specific training for priests who were to work among the indigenous populations in the Spanish colonial Viceroyalty of New Spain, present day Mexico and the southwestern United States.

Of the thirty-eight Spanish missions in Spanish Texas, including the one in Spanish Louisiana, and the six visitas (country chapels) on the lower Rio Grande, nine missions and all six visitas were staffed by the College of Zacatecas.

See also
 College of San Fernando de Mexico
 College of Santa Cruz de Querétaro
 Spanish missions in Louisiana
 Spanish missions in Texas

Catholic seminaries
Seminaries and theological colleges in Mexico
Buildings and structures in Zacatecas
1703 establishments in New Spain
1703 in New Spain
Spanish missions in Texas